His Honor Sir Cecil Patrick Blackwell  (8 November 1881 – 7 November 1944), was a British judge and Liberal Party politician.

Background
Blackwell was born the eldest son of Patrick Thomas Blackwell and Cecilia Tudor Westbrook. He was educated at Blackheath Proprietary School, City of London School, University College, London and Wadham College, Oxford. In 1904 he was Secretary of the Oxford Union Society. In 1910 he married Marguérite Frances Tilleard. In 1919 he was awarded the MBE. He was awarded a knighthood in 1938 New Year Honours.

Professional career
Blackwell was Puisne judge of the High Court of Judicature at Bombay, India from 1926–44.

Political career
Blackwell was Liberal candidate for the Kingswinford division of Staffordshire at the 1923 General Election, when he finished third. He did not stand for parliament again.

Electoral record

See also
Kingswinford (UK Parliament constituency)
1938 New Year Honours
Constituency election results in the 1923 United Kingdom general election

References

1881 births
1944 deaths
Liberal Party (UK) parliamentary candidates
People educated at Blackheath Proprietary School
People educated at the City of London School
Alumni of University College London
Alumni of Wadham College, Oxford
Members of the Inner Temple